Forest Corner is a village in the New Forest National Park of Hampshire, England. It is on the A31 road travelling between Southampton and Bournemouth. Its nearest town is Ringwood, which lies approximately 1.4 miles (2.3 km) to the west.

References

Villages in Hampshire